Ashok Chatterjee (1942 – 22 September 2020) was an Indian association football player.

Playing career
He made his international debut for the India national team at 1965 Merdeka Cup and also represented India at the 1966 Asian Games at Bangkok. He played for both Mohun Bagan and East Bengal in domestic tournaments. He also represented Bengal in Santosh Trophy. With Mohun Bagan, he went to newly independent Bangladesh in May 1972, where they played against Dhaka Mohammedan and Shadhin Bangla football team. He scored the winner against Dhaka Mohammedan.

Honours

India
Merdeka Tournament third-place: 1965, 1966

East Bengal
IFA Shield: 1970

Bengal
Dr. B. C. Roy Trophy: 1962
Santosh Trophy: 1969–70; runner-up: 1964

Individual
Dr. B. C. Roy Trophy top scorer: 1962

References

1942 births
2020 deaths
Indian footballers
India international footballers
Footballers from Kolkata
Association football goalkeepers
Mohun Bagan AC players
East Bengal Club players
Calcutta Football League players
Footballers at the 1966 Asian Games
Asian Games competitors for India